Larry Lowell Russell is a Republican member of the Tennessee House of Representatives for the 21st district, encompassing parts of Loudon County and Monroe County.

Biography
Lowell Russell was born on August 25, 1975 in Maryville, Tennessee. Lowell is the son of Larry Rex Russell and Shirley Geneva Shaw. He has one brother, Cory Alan Russell. Lowell attended Roane State Community College where he obtained his Criminal Justice Degree. Lowell also attended the Tennessee Bureau of Investigation Academy, the Tennessee Highway Patrol Academy and basic police academy at Cleveland State Community College.  He currently lives in the Corntassel Community located in Vonore, Tennessee.

References

External links
IMDB-Lowell Russell
Facebook -Lowell Russell

Living people
1975 births
Middle Tennessee State University alumni
Cleveland State Community College alumni
Republican Party members of the Tennessee House of Representatives
People from Maryville, Tennessee
21st-century American politicians